Lunar Orbiter 4 was a robotic U.S. spacecraft, part of the Lunar Orbiter Program, designed to orbit the Moon, after the three previous orbiters had completed the required needs for Apollo mapping and site selection. It was given a more general objective, to "perform a broad systematic photographic survey of lunar surface features in order to increase the scientific knowledge of their nature, origin, and processes, and to serve as a basis for selecting sites for more detailed scientific study by subsequent orbital and landing missions". It was also equipped to collect selenodetic, radiation intensity, and micrometeoroid impact data.

Mission summary
The spacecraft was placed in a cislunar trajectory and injected into an elliptical near polar high lunar orbit for data acquisition.

After initial photography on May 11, 1967 problems started occurring with the camera's thermal door, which was not responding well to commands to open and close. Fear that the door could become stuck in the closed position covering the camera lenses led to a decision to leave the door open. This required extra attitude control maneuvers on each orbit to prevent light leakage into the camera which would ruin the film. On May 13 it was discovered that light leakage was damaging some of the film, and the door was tested and partially closed. Some fogging of the lens was then suspected due to condensation resulting from the lower temperatures. Changes in the attitude raised the temperature of the camera and generally eliminated the fogging. Continuing problems with the readout drive mechanism starting and stopping beginning on May 20 resulted in a decision to terminate the photographic portion of the mission on May 26. Despite problems with the readout drive the entire film was read and transmitted. The spacecraft acquired photographic data from May 11 to 26, 1967, and readout occurred through June 1, 1967. The orbit was then lowered to gather orbital data for the upcoming Lunar Orbiter 5 mission.

Accurate data was acquired from all other experiments throughout the mission. Radiation data showed increased dosages due to solar particle events producing low energy protons. The spacecraft was used for tracking until it struck the lunar surface due to the natural decay of the orbit no later than October 31, 1967, between 22–30 degrees W longitude.

See also

 Lunar Orbiter Image Recovery Project
 Exploration of the Moon
 Lunar Orbiter 1
 Lunar Orbiter 2
 Lunar Orbiter 3
 Lunar Orbiter 5
 List of artificial objects on the Moon

References

4
Spacecraft launched in 1967
Spacecraft that orbited the Moon
Spacecraft that impacted the Moon
1967 on the Moon